Thep Sarm Rudoo is a 2005 Thai lakorn boran (Classic Play) based on Thai folklore which has been remade several times. This Thai television soap opera is one of the most popular in Thailand at 2005 with many famous actors and actress as the beautiful couple for Thai lakorn boran's fan. The plot is about a child of a king who can turn into 3 incarnations by changing season like turning to man for rainy season, turn to woman for cold season and turn to giant for dry season.

Summary 
Three angels avatared to be the children of a king who ruled a big empire. The king has two queens but with the different personalities. The evil queen is named Ta Sa-nee. The good queen is Manee-nate (Thai: มณีเนตร). Manee-nate gave birth to a boy after having six years of pregnancy. Unfortunately, the child was born with a large body as six-year-old kid and the most terrible is that he has two long fangs. (Phra Rahoo, Thai:พระราหู) The king thinks his wife had an affair with an ogre when Ta Sa-nee confessed that she saw Manee-nate hugging and kissing the statue of an ogre. The king abandoned Manee-nate and Phra Rahoo in the forest. Manee-nate and Phra Rahoo were parted for some times. However, the mother and son met again by the hermit's recusement and the mother found out that her son turned into a different person, a beautiful girl called Chinda Mekhala (Thai: จินดาเมขลา) when winter comes and the girl turned into a handsome boy, called Phra Pirun (Thai: พระพิรุณ) when the rainy season comes, and when summer comes, Phra Rahoo will appear again. The mother and children were protected by two creatures, Monkey-faced human and a stone giant. Despite their happiness, they still faced several dangerous creatures that all became their enemies.

Meanwhile, Manee-nate returned to the empire and explained everything about the children's power to the king. The king banished Ta Sa-nee and her family from their kingdom after realizing that she had lied to him. During the journey Ta Sa-nee met a magical buffalo-man, CoTun, that fell in love with her and dragged her home with him. Years later, they have a son, Sum See, together. Ta Sa-nee wanted Sum See to avenge her and make CoTun train him. When she complained about their home in the cave, CoTun transformed their cave into a castle to please her and named her his queen. He conjured them servants and soldiers. He sent men out to search for her father and old servants and brought him to live with them. Ta Sa-nee was embarrassed by her husband's true nature and told him to not reveal what he really was.

As the children grew up, they turns into the handsome and beautiful men and woman. Feeling restless, Pirun leaves the kingdom to travel with his demon companion, Yunk. He met a tree nymph/spirit, Latana, and fell in love with her. They spend some nights in her tree home and he told her about his condition. When Pirun transformed into Chinda Mekhala, due to the change in season, Latana begged her to stay with her so she could be with Pirun. Chinda Mekhala explained to her that she couldn't because there are things that she must do. Latana refuse to listen and used her magic to stop her from leaving, but nothing works as Chinda Mekhala was stronger than her. Feeling sorry for the poor nymph, Chinda Mekhala explains to her once again that she must let them go and wait until its Pirun's season to come out.

In Chinda Mekhala's journey, she ran into two men, who are actually the king of gods and his subject posing as humans. She saves them from bandits and they decide to travel with her for safety.

In another kingdom, two beautiful princesses, Umpon and Upsun, are ordered to choose a husband by their parents. Men were called to the castle to let the princesses look at. While Upsun is happy about the occasion, Umpon hated it. Umpon refused to leave her room, but her mother forced her outside to the balcony to see the men. Angry at her mother, Umpon decided to choose the most hideous man in the crowd.

Meanwhile, two ogres, father and son disguised themselves as human brothers, heard the news and decided to see how the princesses looked liked. They fell in love with the sisters. The father with Umpon. The son with Upsun. The son enchanted her to throw her flower garland to him. He caught and was taken to the back to prepare for the wedding. When the father attempted to enchant Umpon, she dropped her flower garland and the spell accident hit her aunt instead. Seeing his mistake, the ogre back away into the crowd. Her aunt, who was called an old spinster, came out to find herself a husband to stop people from laughing at her. Hit by the spell, she threw her flower garland at the old ogre, and it landed on his head. Reluctantly, he married her.

Chinda Mekhala having recently transformed into Rahoo a few days before, joined the crowd by accident. Seeing his fangs and ogre nature, Umpon threw her flower garland to him. He caught it without knowing what it meant. Umpon's mother is angry at her for choosing an ogre and sent her to like in a small cabin in the woods. Rahoo was madly in love with Umpon, but kept his distance as she's emotional about her parents abandoning her.

On Upsun's wedding night, her husband is unable to touch her body. When the sisters were young their parents had prayed to the gods to protect their daughters. From then on the girls have a magical protective spell on them that cause evil men to feel a sensation of burning when they touch the girls. This did not happen to Rahoo because he was Umpon's soul mate and truly loves her.

During their marriage, Umpon disliked Rahoo and treated him poorly. She revealed to her sister that she often felt angry when she saw his face. But her anger slowly dissolves as she began to fall in love with him. It is later revealed that Umpon and Rahoo were lovers in their previous life in heaven. She was angry in at him for leaving her and joining his friends to reincarnate. She reincarnated to be with him, but she still had her emotions of anger at his abandoning her.

During those big fighting between the god, giant, nymph, Evil birds and buffalo creature. Phra Pirun lost tree-nymph wife. She was killed by the Ogre in order to help him.  However, Chinda Makeala, Phra Rahoo, Phra Pirun still strong and destroy those evil creature with the help of the Supreme God of heaven and rescued their parent from the evil. As now, They can break into the different person. Finally, Piroom meet his new wife named Apsorn Sawan (Thai:อัปสรสวรรค์ ) who is a daughter of a king, Rahoo and his wife, Suwan Ampon (Thai:สุวรรณอัมพร ) start their true happiness as his wife now has pregnant and a last couple is Chinda Makela and the Supreme God of heaven whose can live with each other happily without any separation from another.

Channel 7 (Thailand) original programming
Thai television soap operas
2000s Thai television series
2005 Thai television series debuts
2006 Thai television series endings